Cole Vosbury is an American singer, songwriter, producer and musician who has appeared on Season 5 of the NBC singing competition The Voice as a member of CeeLo Green's team and later Blake Shelton's team. During his time on The Voice, six of Vosbury's singles charted on the Billboard charts. He released his self-produced debut album, "Entity: One" on September 1, 2020.

Vosbury also has a duo with his partner Amanda June called The Lovers. The duo released a 7 song Self-titled EP on February 26, 2020.

The Voice
On the second episode of the Blind Auditions broadcast on September 24, 2013, he performed The Jeffersons theme song, "Movin' On Up." Only Cee Lo Green turned his chair, thus he defaulted to Team CeeLo.

Vosbury has said of his time on The Voice, "(The Voice) is just another stage to perform on for whoever may happen to be watching and listening. It's a job to get more jobs. It was a brief moment in my life and in the live's of anyone who was sharing in that moment with us, but for all the billions of people who didn't see it and never will, it may as well not have even happened at all."

In Knockout Round, Vosbury lost his battle, he was stolen by Blake.

Discography
Entity: One (2020)                                                                                                               
ThelonerThestoner (2020)

Singles

References

Living people
Participants in American reality television series
Writers from Shreveport, Louisiana
The Voice (franchise) contestants
21st-century American male singers
21st-century American singers
1991 births